The Siemens-Halske Sh 4 was a five-cylinder, air-cooled, radial engine for aircraft built in Germany in the 1920s. First run in 1921, it was rated at 40 kW (55 hp).

Applications
 Albatros L 59
 Albatros L 71
 Caspar U.1
 Dietrich-Gobiet DP.VIIA
 Dornier Libelle
 Działowski D.K.D.4bis
 Junkers K 16
 Udet U 3
 Udet U 6
 Focke-Wulf S 24
 Dietrich DP.II (one aircraft only)

See also

References
bungartz.nl
Repülőmúzeum Szolnok

Aircraft air-cooled radial piston engines
Siemens-Halske aircraft engines
1920s aircraft piston engines